Abderrazak Hamdallah (born 17 December 1990) is a Moroccan professional footballer who plays as a striker for Saudi Professional League club Al-Ittihad and the Morocco national team. He is nicknamed The Executioner for his goal scoring ability.

He started his professional career playing for Olympic Club de Safi in Morocco, later transferring to Aalesunds in Norway. After one season with them, he joined Chinese club Guangzhou R&F. In 2015, he transferred to El Jaish, where he won the 2016 Qatar Cup. Soon later he signed with Qatari club Al-Rayyan. He felt in terms with Al-Rayyan and joined Saudi Al Nassr. In the season, 2018–19 Saudi Professional League he scored a league record of 34 goals in one season, and was the world's leading goalscorer during the 2019 calendar year with 57 goals overall. He won the 2018–19 Saudi Professional League and two Saudi Super Cup.

A full international for Morocco since 2012, Hamdallah has represented his country at the 2013 Africa Cup of Nations and 2022 FIFA World Cup tournaments.

Early life
Born in Safi, Morocco, Hamdallah was the youngest of seven children of the family. Hamadallah spoke about his childhood, stating:I started playing football in the street with other children of the city where I was born, Safi. As a teenager, I enrolled in a club in town. I was playing almost every day after school and all weekend. My older brother always supported me. He encouraged me to work hard.

Club career
Hamdallah received his initial football formation at Nejm Shabab Safi club, before moving to the first team, Olympic Club de Safi, where his professional career began since the 2010–11 Botola, during which he played his first match in the Moroccan championship. He managed to score his first goal for the team against Difaâ Hassani El Jadidi. Hamdallah scored twice for Olympic Club de Safi in his first appearance in the Moroccan Throne Cup against Raja CA, the match ended in a 3–2 victory. The 2011–12 Botola marked the real start of Hamdallah at the scoring level, as he finished the season by scoring 15 goals, occupying the second row, two goals ahead of the Chadian new striker Karl Max Barthélémy. In the 2012–13 season, Hamdallah scored 15 goals in the first two-thirds of the tournament before joining, during March 2013, to professionally with the Norwegian club Ålesund. He scored his first hat-trick for the team against Wydad de Fès. The financial value of Hamdallah's transfer to Olesund Club amounted to one million US dollars.

Aalesund
On 14 February 2013, it was confirmed that Hamdallah had joined Tippeliga club Aalesund. The transfer fee was in the region of €1 million or 7.4 million Norwegian Krone and the player signed a three-year contract, his first European contract. The transfer fee was the highest Aalesund has paid for a player ever.

Hamdallah spoke about the first time he arrived at Norway, stating: "It was a difficult experience because I arrived in a country that's very cold, but through an effort of will, I overcame every obstacle. I was the first player from the Moroccan championship to come to Norway, and my signing generated a lot of attention in the newspapers. In the end, I was able to silence my critics by finishing as one of the leading scorers in the league."

Hamdallah made his debut on 1 April 2013 as a substitute in the 1–0 away win of Sandnes Ulf and then scored his first goal for the club, in a 2–0 win over Sarpsborg 08 on 14 April 2013. Then on 13 May 2013, Hamdallah scored his first hat-trick for Aalesund in a 7–1 win over Lillestrøm SK, which he helped the club into second place after nine games. After scoring ten goals so far this season, Hamadallah scored his second hat-trick of the season, in a 3–1 win over Viking on 25 October 2013. In his first season with the club, Hamdallah scored 15 times in 27 appearances and was included in the Team of the Year. Also, it left Hamdallah as the club's top scorer, though he was the second in the league behind Frode Johnsen.

Guangzhou R&F
In February 2014, Hamdallah joined Chinese Super League side Guangzhou R&F. Upon the move, Hamdallah will be coached by Sven-Göran Eriksson for a record fee of €4.5 million or 33,3 million Norwegian Krone. His departure from Aalesund left the club very affected, due to his goal-scoring form, something the club struggled with after Hamdallah left Norway for China.

After making two appearances at the start of the season, Hamdallah scored his first hat-trick of the season, in a 3–1 win over Shanghai Shenxin on 22 March 2014. In the next game against Hangzhou Greentown, he scored another hat-trick in a 6–2 win. He scored again in the next match against Henan Jianye, which he scored twice in a 4–0 win. After a week out over a leg injury, Hamdallah scored the winning goal, in a 1–0 win over against reigning champion, Guangzhou Evergrande. In his first season at Guangzhou R&F, Hamdallah made twenty-two appearances and scoring twenty-two times.

Despite making a good start in the first four matches and scoring three times against Hangzhou Greentown, Shanghai SIPG and Guizhou Renhe. Hamdallah also scored in the group-stage of AFC Champions League match against Gamba Osaka. However, Hamdallah suffered leg injury and then continuously suffered from injuries. Not only that, his attitude caused a stir from manager Cosmin Contra and the pair fell out. It was announced on 3 July 2015 that Hamdallah would leave the club.

Qatari clubs
On 24 July 2015, Hamdallah joined El Jaish in the Qatar Stars League on a two-year contract with an option of extending for a third year. As part of the move, Aalesund received 25 percent of the transfer fee paid to Guangzhou. Hamdallah had missed half of the season of 2016 due to a knee injury. His scoring has dropped this season due to absence of half of the games in this season. On 25 April 2016, Hamdallah scored in the semi-final in a 3–2 win against Al Sadd SC. They defeated Al-Duhail SC in the final. On 20 January 2017, Hamdallah signed a contract until 2019 with Al-Rayyan SC. On 23 August 2018, Hamdallah terminated his contract with Al-Rayyan.

Al Nassr
On 23 August 2018, Hamdallah joined Al Nassr in the Saudi Professional League. He made his debut against Al Qadsiah FC and made two assists. In his second match, he scored his first goal for the club against Al Taawoun FC. By April 2019 he had scored 100 league goals, a record since the league became professional in 2007. Despite the bad start due to a previous ankle injury Hamadallah was able to end his first season in the Saudi Professional League as the top scorer after impressively scoring 68 goals. In the 2018–19 Season he won league title with his team. He scored a record of 34 goals with his teammate Nordin Amrabat. He scored in the final match against Al Batin. On 3 January 2019, Hamdallah scored a hat-trick against Al Jandal SC in Round of 64 in the 2019 King Cup. 10 days later, he scored a super hat-trick against Al Ansar FC. He scored another super hat-trick against Al-Fayha FC in the Round of 16. On 27 April 2019, Hamdallah scored a double in a 4–2 loss in the semi-final against Al Ittihad of the 2019 King Cup. By the end of 2019, Hamdallah managed to beat several stars such as Robert Lewandowski and Lionel Messi as the world's top scorer after reaching 57 goals.

On 4 January 2020, Hamdallah scored in a 1–1 draw against Al Taawoun FC to win the 2019 Saudi Super Cup. On 30 January 2021, Hamdallah scored in a 3–0 victory against Al Hilal SFC to win the 2020 Saudi Super Cup. In the 2020 AFC Champions League, Hamdallah had a great impact on his team. He scored in a 2–2 draw against Al Sadd SC and scored a double in a 2–0 win against Sepahan S.C. In the quarter finals he scored the only goal in a 1–0 victory against Al Taawoun FC. They lost in the semi-finals in after a penalty shootout against Persepolis F.C. On 23 November, Al Nassr FC officially terminated its contract with Hamdallah. Hamdallah played his final match for the club in a 1–0 loss against Ettifaq FC.

Al Ittihad
On 16 December 2021, Hamdallah joined Al Ittihad FC in the Saudi Professional League. On 14 January 2022, he scored his first goal for the club in a Friendlies against Newcastle United. He scored his first league goal against Al Raed FC. On 26 February 2022, Hamdallah scored a hattrick in a 4–3 victory over Al Ahli in the Jeddah Derby. Thus becoming the first footballer to score a hattrick in the Jeddah Derby since the league became professional in 2007. On 2 August 2022, Hamdallah was suspended for by the Saudi football committee for four months with a 80 thousand dollar fine after a complaint by his former club. On 7 September the suspension has been uplifted making Hamdallah eligible to play the upcoming games. On 22 December 2022, Hamdallah scored a goal in a 1–1 draw against Al Shabab FC in the 2022–23 King Cup Round of 16, Thus becoming the All-time top scorer of the King Cup with a total of 22 goals. On 4 February 2023, Hamdallah extended his contract with Al-Ittihad until 2025. On 18 March 2023, Hamdallah scored a hat-trick in a 5-1 win against Al Fateh SC, thus making him the player with the most hat-tricks in the Saudi Professional League with a total of 9 hat-tricks.

International career
On 22 December 2009, Hamdallah was called up to the Morocco national under-23 team for a week long training camp. On 13 December 2010, Hamdallah scored a goal against Libya's Under-23 team in the first game for Morocco in the 2010 UNAF U-23 Tournament, as Morocco went on to win the game 4–0. On 18 December 2010, Hamdallah scored in a 2–1 victory against Cameroon's Under-23 team.

On 9 June 2013, Hamdallah scored his first goal for the Morocco national team. He retired from international duty in November 2019. On 14 February, Hamdallah announced his readiness to carry the Moroccan national team shirt without any conditions. On 6 November 2022, Hamdallah apologized to the Moroccan public for his behavior that got him terminated from representing the national team.

On 10 November 2022, he was named in Morocco's 23-man squad for the 2022 FIFA World Cup in Qatar.

Style of play
Hamdallah is described as an "unstoppable phenomenon", and is considered a prolific goalscorer. He is a technical player, with excellent movement, great heading technique, and deadly last touches. Hamdallah can score with both feet, and also capable of providing assists due to his vision. He has been criticized of his pace though. He is nicknamed "the Executioner" for his goalscoring ability.

Personal life
Hamadallah is a practicing Muslim, and has been seen many times doing Umrah.

On 6 February 2022, Hamdallah built a house for Rayan's parents after the Death of Rayan Aourram. and asked all the celebrities to donate.

On 25 October 2022, Fahd Barbaa, Hamdallah's lawyer announced that his client had won his case against his former club Al Nassr FC, which was before the International Football Association Board.

Career statistics

Club

International

Scores and results list Morocco's goal tally first, score column indicates score after each Hamdallah goal.

Honours
El Jaish
Qatar Cup: 2015–16

Al-Nassr
Saudi Professional League: 2018–19
Saudi Super Cup: 2019, 2020

Al-Ittihad
Saudi Super Cup: 2022–23

Individual
Botola Pro Top Scorer: 2012–13
Aalesund Player of the Year: 2014
Qatar Stars League Top Scorer: 2015–16 (21 goals)
Saudi Professional League Player of the Season: 2018–19
Saudi Professional League Player of the Month: December 2018, March 2019, April 2019, August 2020,February 2022
King Cup Top Scorer: 2018–19 (14 goals) 
Saudi Professional League Golden Boot: 2018–19 (34 goals), 2019–20 (29 goals)
Saudi Professional League Top Assists: 2018–19
Al-Nassr Player of the Year: 2019
Globe Soccer Awards Best Arab Player: 2019
IFFHS World's Best Top Goal Scorer: 2019
Asian Champions League Top Scorer: 2020
Asian Champions League Team of the Tournament: 2016, 2020
Saudi Super Cup Player of the tournament: 2022
Saudi Super Cup top scorer: 2022

Records

The historical top scorer in the Saudi King Cup: 22 goals
The historical top scorer in the Saudi Super Cup: 5 goals
The fastest player to score a (100 goals) in the history of the Saudi Professional League 
The player who scored the most hat-tricks in the history of the Saudi Professional League
The player who scored the most super hat-tricks in the history of the Saudi Professional League
Most scored player in one season in the Saudi Professional League: 2018–19
Most scored player in one season in the Saudi King Cup: 2019
First player to score a hat-trick in the Jeddah derby
The player with the longest goal-scoring run in the history of the Saudi Professional League: 13 times
Most scored player in different clubs in one season in the Saudi Professional League: 14 clubs
The player with the most number of hat-tricks in the Saudi Professional League: 9 hat-tricks

Orders
Order of the Throne: 2022

References

External links

1990 births
Living people
People from Safi, Morocco
Association football forwards
Moroccan footballers
Morocco international footballers
2011 CAF U-23 Championship players
2013 Africa Cup of Nations players
2022 FIFA World Cup players
Olympic Club de Safi players
Aalesunds FK players
Guangzhou City F.C. players
El Jaish SC players
Al-Rayyan SC players
Al Nassr FC players
Ittihad FC players
Botola players
Eliteserien players
Chinese Super League players
Qatar Stars League players
Saudi Professional League players
Moroccan expatriate footballers
Moroccan expatriate sportspeople in Norway
Expatriate footballers in Norway
Moroccan expatriate sportspeople in China
Expatriate footballers in China
Moroccan expatriate sportspeople in Qatar
Expatriate footballers in Qatar
Moroccan expatriate sportspeople in Saudi Arabia
Expatriate footballers in Saudi Arabia